BBC Channel Islands may refer to:
 BBC Channel Islands News
 BBC Radio Jersey
 BBC Radio Guernsey

See also
 CBBC Channel, a children's television channel operated by the BBC